Coggins or Coggin is a surname of Celtic origin specifically Wales. The Coggins family lived in the parish of Cogan, which is in the diocese of Llandaff in the county of Glamorgan. The name literally means "a cup or bowl"  and probably meant "dweller in a bowl-shaped valley."

Notable people with the surname include:

Billy Coggins (1901–1958), English football player
Cecil H. Coggins (1922–2019), American physician
Dave Coggin, former pitcher in Major League baseball 
Herbert L. Coggins (1881–1974), American editor and author
Jacob Coggins (born 1978), American soccer player
Jack Coggins (1911–2006), artist, author and illustrator
Leola Hall Coggins (1881–1930), American architect
Richard J. Coggins (1929–2017), British biblical commentator

Fictional characters
Lester Coggins, a character in the American television series Under the Dome
George Coggins, Scrap Metal merchant in "Chitty Chitty Bang Bang" 1968 Musical Film - played by Desmond Llewelyn

See also
Coggin College of Business, part of the University of North Florida
Coggins test, a diagnostic test for equine infectious anemia developed by Dr. Leroy Coggins
Gilman Coggin House, a historic house in Massachusetts
Coggins Boot Factory, Raunds, Northamptonshire

References